The forest tuco-tuco (Ctenomys sylvanus) was formerly considered a species of rodent in the family Ctenomyidae. It is endemic to Salta and southeast Jujuy Provinces in northwest Argentina. The IUCN currently recognizes it as a subspecies of C. frater.

References

Mammals of Argentina
Tuco-tucos
Endemic fauna of Argentina
Mammals described in 1919
Taxa named by Oldfield Thomas
Taxobox binomials not recognized by IUCN